Lake Richmond (Aboriginal Australian name: Naragebup) is a freshwater lake in Rockingham, Western Australia. It is believed to be named after the London borough. It is part of Rockingham Lakes Regional Park.

Overview

The internal structure of the thrombolites is believed to be unique in the world.

In 1996, the Western Australian Museum concluded that structures on the lake were likely to be tidal weirs constructed by pre-colonial Indigenous Australians for use as fish traps. They were given preliminary protection under the Aboriginal Heritage Act and the Djeran Fish Festival was subsequently organised as a celebration. However, the Department of Indigenous Affairs later concluded that they were not Aboriginal sites, following a review of aerial photographs and claims by a local resident that he had built the structures between the early 1960s and early 1980s.

Before 1960, the lake's salinity was 20003500 mg/L. In the 1960s it was used as part of an urban drainage scheme; the Water Board constructed inlet and outlet drains. Subsequently the salinity level dropped to 300400 mg/L.

A boardwalk extends approximately  into the lake.

Water birds that inhabit the area include the Australian pelican, black swan, Australian shelduck, musk duck, white-faced heron and common greenshank. The lake is home to the Swan River goby (Pseudogobius olorum), eastern mosquitofish, sea mullet, goldfish and yabbies.

The lake was used as a source of fresh water by the local indigenous Noongar people, as well as the settlers of the Swan River Colony.

The 10th Light Horse Regiment had a camp near the lake during the war years.

In 2017, the lake was given a permanent entry on the State Register of Heritage Places. It also listed on the WA Register of Aboriginal Sites, as RAS #15974.

Notes

References

Richmond
State Register of Heritage Places in the City of Rockingham
Rockingham, Western Australia
Rockingham Lakes Regional Park